Anthony Derek Rogers (born 3 April 1990 in Norwich, Norfolk) is a Grand Prix motorcycle racer from United Kingdom.

Career statistics

By season

Races by year
(key)

References

http://www.motogp.com/en/riders/Anthony+Rogers

English motorcycle racers
1990 births
Living people
125cc World Championship riders
Sportspeople from Norwich